Alexander Mathews may refer to:

 Alexander Mathews (priest) (1840–1895), Archdeacon of Mauritius
 Alexander F. Mathews (1838–1906), American businessman and banker